Novo Selo (in Serbian Cyrillic: Ново Село) is a village in Serbia. It is situated in the Kanjiža municipality, in the North Banat District, Vojvodina province. At the 2002 census. the village had a population of 211 with a Hungarian ethnic majority (87.67%).

See also
List of places in Serbia
List of cities, towns and villages in Vojvodina

Places in Bačka